Gordan Georgiev (born 8 November 1978) is a Macedonian politician in the Assembly of North Macedonia for the Social Democratic Union of Macedonia. He was born in Skopje and educated at Sciences Po, Paris (Political Science) and King's College London (MA European Studies, 2004).

References

1978 births
Living people
Sciences Po alumni
Alumni of King's College London
Politicians from Skopje
Members of the Assembly of North Macedonia
Social Democratic Union of Macedonia politicians